Coprinus dunarum is a species of fungus belonging to the family Agaricaceae.

A 2015 study of its genomic DNA sequence concluded that it was synonymous with Coprinopsis acuminata.

References

Agaricaceae